The Metropolitan Corporation (MC) (Urdu: بلدیہ عظمی) is a municipal authority established under the local governments in Pakistan. According to Local Governments Act of Punjab, Sindh, Khyber-Pakhtunkhwa, Balochistan, Gilgit-Baltistan, and Azad Jammu and Kashmir, the Metropolitan Corporation is a corporate entity with perpetual succession, a seal, and the authority to purchase, keep, and engage into any contract as well as to bring and receive legal actions.

There are four Metropolitan Corporations in Pakistan and the Mayor is the head of each Metropolitan Corporation.

Functions 
Metropolitan Corporation's duties include:

 Approving spatial plans, master plans, zoning, land use plans, including land classification and reclassification, environmental control, urban design, urban renewal, and ecological balances.
 Enact laws and bye-laws governing public utilities, infrastructure, roads, markets, zoning, land use, housing, and the environment.
 Accept plans for mass transit and public transportation, as well as the building of inter-town routes, expressways, bridges, and underpasses.
 Preserve cultural and historical resources.
 Work on the city's landscaping, monuments, and embellishment.
 Approving fees and taxes.
 Relief for the poor, those in need, children, widows, orphans, and those with disabilities.
 Regulate markets and services, award licenses, permits, and permissions, and, when appropriate, apply fines for violations.
 Planning, engineering, and control of the movement of people and goods through the use of traffic signals, road signs, street markings, parking spaces, and transportation hubs, stops, stands, and terminals.

List of Metropolitan Corporations

References 

Municipal corporations in Pakistan
Metropolitan corporations in Pakistan